Bagh-e Yaqub (also Romanized as Bāgh-e Ya‘qūb and Bāgh Ya‘qūb; also known as Payagol and Payeh Gol) is a village in Meydan Chay Rural District, in the Central District of Tabriz County, East Azerbaijan Province, Iran. At the 2006 census, its population was 515, in 142 families.

References 

Populated places in Tabriz County